The women's handball tournament at the 2005 Mediterranean Games was held from 25 June to 1 July in Vícar.

Preliminary round
All times are local (UTC+2).

Group A

Group B

Playoffs

Bracket

Semifinals

Seventh place game

Fifth place game

Bronze medal game

Gold medal game

Ranking and statistics

Final standings

Statistics

Top goalscorers

Source: Almeria 2005

Top goalkeepers

Source: Almeria 2005

References

Women
Mediterranean Games